Adalberto Bravo (born February 1, 1965), is an American-born Puerto Rican musician and songwriter.

Early life
Bravo was born in Brooklyn, New York. He graduated from Hillcrest High School in 1983. Bravo also spent much of his time living in Venezuela and Puerto Rico to study music. In the early 1980s, Bravo and his family moved to Miami, Florida, eventually relocating to Orlando, where he continued his music studies at University of Central Florida, mastering his skills in guitar, piano, and composing/arranging. Bravo later recorded his first album as a solo guitarist, Cuanto Te Amo, in 1986 under his own label.

Career
Throughout the late 1980s and early 1990s, Bravo collaborated with numerous artists, including Tito Puente, Carlos Santana, and performed with other bands such as El Gran Combo de Puerto Rico and Son By Four. Bravo also formed his own band, "Orquesta Identidad" (later renamed "Adalberto Bravo y su Orquesta"), backing artists such as Tito Nieves, Oscar D'León, Melina León, Gisselle, Frankie Negron, Jose Feliciano, and many others during their performances in Florida. Bravo and his band released their first CD, Te Quiero, in March 2000. In 2004, Bravo released his second solo guitar album, Smooth Passions, consisting of his cover versions of compositions by Antônio Carlos Jobim and Ruben Fuentes among others. Bravo returned to recording in 2014, releasing a tribute album to the late Cheo Feliciano, who died earlier that year. To date, Bravo continues performing with his band and as a solo guitarist in numerous venues and events throughout Central Florida, including the House of Blues and Bongos Cuban Cafe at Walt Disney World.

Personal life
Bravo has been married to Maria Rivera since 2002, and both currently reside in Kissimmee, Florida. Bravo's two younger brothers, Richard and Jerry, are also musicians that have shared the stage with numerous A-list celebrity artists.

Discography
 1986: Cuanto Te Amo
 2000: Te Quiero
 2004: Smooth Passions
 2014: Recordando a Cheo Feliciano

References

External links
Official website

1965 births
Living people
American male guitarists
Bossa nova guitarists
Latin jazz guitarists
Latin music songwriters
Lead guitarists
Musicians from Brooklyn
Salsa musicians
20th-century American guitarists
20th-century American male musicians
American male jazz musicians